Donny Lalonde (born March 12, 1960) is a retired professional
boxer. His nickname is "Golden Boy," after the Golden Boy statue atop the Manitoba Legislative Building in his boxing home town of Winnipeg. Lalonde held the WBC Light Heavyweight Championship from 1987 to 1988.

Early career
Lalonde was born in Kitchener, Ontario, Canada. He got into boxing "to try to reestablish self-esteem, respect, pride," he said. "Boxing is a way of doing that." Lalonde had an amateur record of 11-4 and turned professional in 1980.

Early professional career
Lalonde won his first four fights and then lost a six-round decision to Wilbert "Vampire" Johnson in March 1981. They had a rematch seven months later, which Lalonde won by a second-round knockout.

In 1983, Lalonde won the Canadian Light Heavyweight Championship, knocking out Roddie McDonald in ten rounds. He defeated McDonald even though he had a smashed middle knuckle on his right hand and was recovering from surgery on his left shoulder, which he first separated when he crashed into the boards while playing hockey in 1977.

Over the years, the shoulder had separated some thirty times and had become so loose that he was able to pop it back into socket himself. To prepare for his fight with McDonald, he underwent an operation in which doctors inserted a pin to bind the joint, which severely restricted his ability to raise his left arm. It affected Lalonde's style: He would paw with his left, looking to set up his powerful right.

In 1985, with a record of 19-1, Lalonde fought Willie Edwards for the NABF Light Heavyweight Championship. Edwards stopped Lalonde in nine rounds.

Rise to the top

At the end of 1985, Lalonde hired Dave Wolf as his manager and Teddy Atlas as his trainer. Lalonde went 8-0 with Atlas as his trainer, but they clashed in temperament and style. He and Atlas parted ways, and Lalonde hired Tommy Gallagher and Bobby Cassidy as his new trainers.

In his first fight with Gallagher and Cassidy, he outpointed Mustafa Hamsho on May 7, 1987. His next fight was for a world title. On November 27, 1987, Lalonde knocked out Eddie Davis in two rounds to win the vacant WBC Light Heavyweight Championship in Port of Spain, Trinidad and Tobago. His first title defense was also in Port of Spain. On May 29, 1988, he knocked out former WBA Light Heavyweight Champion Leslie Stewart in five rounds.

On November 7, 1988, Lalonde fought Sugar Ray Leonard at Caesar's Palace in Las Vegas, Nevada. It was by far the biggest fight of his career. Lalonde's purse was six million dollars. They fought for Lalonde's WBC Light Heavyweight Championship and the newly created WBC Super Middleweight Championship, which meant that Lalonde had to make 168 lbs. Some were concerned that moving down from the light heavyweight limit of 175 lbs would weaken Lalonde, but he told HBO's Larry Merchant after the fight that he had no trouble making weight, and he felt great on the night of the fight.

Lalonde's size and awkwardness troubled Leonard. In the fourth round, a right hand to the top of Leonard's head dropped him for just the second time in his career. Early in the ninth, Lalonde hurt Leonard with a right to the chin. Leonard fired back and hurt Lalonde with a right. He drove him to the ropes and unleashed a furious assault. Lalonde tried to tie up Leonard, but got dropped with a powerful left hook. He rose but was soon down again, and the fight was stopped. Leonard won his fourth and fifth world titles.

Retirement and return
After Leonard vacated the WBC Light Heavyweight Championship, Lalonde was scheduled to fight Dennis Andries for the title on June 24, 1989 in Atlantic City, New Jersey. Shortly before the fight, Lalonde shocked many by retiring. "I just don't have the desire to hit people anymore," Lalonde said.

Lalonde returned to boxing in 1991. After four straight wins, he fought Bobby Czyz for the WBA Cruiserweight Championship on May 9, 1992 in Las Vegas. Czyz dropped Lalonde in the first round with a left hook. Lalonde got up and survived the round, but for the rest of the fight, Czyz continued to come forward and land effectively with left jabs and hooks. Czyz retained his title with a twelve-round unanimous decision.

After losing to Czyz, Lalonde was inactive for four years. He returned to the ring and won three straight fights, then fought a six-round draw with Kevin Pompey in 1998. Lalonde stayed out of the ring again until 2002. After three consecutive wins, Lalonde fought former two-division champion Virgil Hill in Winnipeg on July 7, 2003.

In the first round, Lalonde fell into the ropes after getting hit by a left hook. The referee ruled it a knockdown, but Lalonde said the fall was due more to bad footwork. Lalonde spent most of the fight backpedaling and looking to land his right hand. Hill controlled the fight, landing frequently with jabs and hooks while avoiding Lalonde's powerful right. Hill won by a ten-round unanimous decision. It was Lalonde's last fight. He finished with a record of 41-5-1 with 33 knockouts.

Teddy Atlas' book revelation
In 2006, Teddy Atlas published his autobiography, Atlas: From the Streets to the Ring: A Son's Struggle to Become a Man. In the book, he revealed that he came close to murdering Lalonde. "When he made six million for Leonard, it tore me up," Atlas wrote. "It made me murderous." If Atlas had not been fired by Lalonde and he had trained him for the Leonard fight, he would've gotten 10% of his purse, $600,000.

Atlas described getting a gun and going to Lalonde's apartment building in New York City. After getting buzzed into the building by another tenant, Atlas went to Lalonde's apartment and knocked on the door. "If he had opened the door, he was dead," Atlas wrote. "I would have pulled the trigger, turned around, and walked away." However, there was no answer.

Atlas waited through the night for Lalonde to return, periodically phoning the apartment. When he finally got through, Lalonde's girlfriend answered. When asked if Lalonde was home, she said yes. Atlas hung up and started making his way over to the apartment. Somewhere along the way, for whatever reason, Atlas changed his mind.

Lalonde knew nothing about it until the book came out and a friend told him about it. "It actually didn't surprise me when I heard it," he said. "Teddy got into fights with trainers and fighters quite a bit when I was with him. He may not be the most stable person walking around."

Honors
Lalonde was inducted into the Manitoba Sports Hall of Fame and Museum in 1990.

T.K.O.O.O
Lalonde is now aiming to help boxers live a healthier life in their golden years through his initiative "TKOOO" (Taking "K"are Of Our Own).  Its mission is to educate fighters on the benefits of natural and preventative medicine, including the reduction or elimination of the trauma induced by effects of combat sport.

Controversies
In 2004, Lalonde declared bankruptcy in B.C., owing $1.5 million to creditors, mostly linked to failed real estate ventures, and moved to Tamarindo in northwestern Costa Rica where he sold pre-construction lots in a new community. Ten years later, about 30 investors hired a lawyer, hoping to recoup $3.5 million in a class-action lawsuit. As of 2020, no development has taken place

Personal life
Lalonde meditates daily and was known to have prayed before his fights that nobody would be hurt. In 1988, William Nack commented that Lalonde's "diet is chiefly vegetarian; he eschews all processed foods. He drinks juices out of his own squeezer and eats his meals with chopsticks. He trains to the music of Bob Dylan and Cat Stevens. He submits himself daily to the painful rigors of deep-tissue massaging, or rolfing."

Professional boxing record

|-
|align="center" colspan=8|41 Wins (33 knockouts, 8 decisions), 5 Losses (2 knockouts, 3 decisions), 1 Draw 
|-
| align="center" style="border-style: none none solid solid; background: #e3e3e3"|Result
| align="center" style="border-style: none none solid solid; background: #e3e3e3"|Record
| align="center" style="border-style: none none solid solid; background: #e3e3e3"|Opponent
| align="center" style="border-style: none none solid solid; background: #e3e3e3"|Type
| align="center" style="border-style: none none solid solid; background: #e3e3e3"|Round
| align="center" style="border-style: none none solid solid; background: #e3e3e3"|Date
| align="center" style="border-style: none none solid solid; background: #e3e3e3"|Location
| align="center" style="border-style: none none solid solid; background: #e3e3e3"|Notes
|-align=center
|Loss
|
|align=left| Virgil Hill
|UD
|10
|05/07/2003
|align=left| CanWest Global Park, Winnipeg, Manitoba, Canada
|align=left|
|-
|Win
|
|align=left| Willard Lewis
|UD
|10
|14/03/2003
|align=left| Convention Centre, Winnipeg, Manitoba, Canada
|align=left|
|-
|Win
|
|align=left| Stacy Goodson
|KO
|1
|06/12/2002
|align=left| Convention Centre, Winnipeg, Manitoba, Canada
|align=left|
|-
|Win
|
|align=left| Tony Menefee
|UD
|8
|02/10/2002
|align=left| Convention Centre, Winnipeg, Manitoba, Canada
|align=left|
|-
|Draw
|
|align=left| Kevin Pompey
|PTS
|6
|28/05/1998
|align=left| Westchester County Center, White Plains, New York, U.S.
|align=left|
|-
|Win
|
|align=left| Joe Stevenson
|TKO
|7
|09/04/1997
|align=left| The Aladdin, Paradise, Nevada, U.S.
|align=left|
|-
|Win
|
|align=left| George Sponagle
|KO
|3
|12/12/1996
|align=left| Pacific Coliseum, Vancouver, British Columbia, Canada
|align=left|
|-
|Win
|
|align=left| Ed Dalton
|UD
|8
|02/11/1996
|align=left| Memorial Arena, Victoria, British Columbia, Canada
|align=left|
|-
|Loss
|
|align=left| Bobby Czyz
|UD
|12
|08/05/1992
|align=left| Riviera Hotel & Casino, Winchester, Nevada, U.S.
|align=left|
|-
|Win
|
|align=left| Dave Fiddler
|TKO
|3
|17/12/1991
|align=left| Convention Centre, Winnipeg, Manitoba, Canada
|align=left|
|-
|Win
|
|align=left| David Bates
|KO
|4
|03/12/1991
|align=left| Memphis, Tennessee, U.S.
|align=left|
|-
|Win
|
|align=left| Bert Gravley
|TKO
|7
|20/09/1991
|align=left| Sun Dome, Tampa, Florida, U.S.
|align=left|
|-
|Win
|
|align=left| Darryl Fromm
|TKO
|3
|05/09/1991
|align=left| LuLu's Road House, Kitchener, Ontario, Canada
|align=left|
|-
|Loss
|
|align=left| Sugar Ray Leonard
|TKO
|9
|07/11/1988
|align=left| Caesars Palace, Paradise, Nevada, U.S.
|align=left|
|-
|Win
|
|align=left| Leslie Stewart
|TKO
|5
|29/05/1988
|align=left| National Stadium, Port of Spain, Trinidad and Tobago
|align=left|
|-
|Win
|
|align=left| Eddie Davis
|TKO
|2
|27/11/1987
|align=left| National Stadium, Port of Spain, Trinidad and Tobago
|align=left|
|-
|Win
|
|align=left| Mustafa Hamsho
|UD
|12
|07/05/1987
|align=left| Felt Forum, New York City, New York, U.S.
|align=left|
|-
|Win
|
|align=left| Benito Fernandez
|TKO
|9
|06/11/1986
|align=left| Convention Centre, Winnipeg, Manitoba, Canada
|align=left|
|-
|Win
|
|align=left| Charles Henderson
|TKO
|8
|30/09/1986
|align=left| Premier Center, Sterling Heights, Michigan, U.S.
|align=left|
|-
|Win
|
|align=left| Terrence Walker
|TKO
|6
|28/08/1986
|align=left| Felt Forum, New York City, New York, U.S.
|align=left|
|-
|Win
|
|align=left| Frank Walters
|KO
|1
|12/08/1986
|align=left| Ashland Armory, Ashland, Kentucky, U.S.
|align=left|
|-
|Win
|
|align=left| Lenny Edwards
|TKO
|3
|30/04/1986
|align=left| Lakeland Community College, Mentor, Ohio, U.S.
|align=left|
|-
|Win
|
|align=left| Joe Brewer
|TKO
|3
|06/04/1986
|align=left| Essex Racquet Club, West Orange, New Jersey, U.S.
|align=left|
|-
|Win
|
|align=left| Roberto Rodriguez
|TKO
|2
|08/02/1986
|align=left| Enid, Oklahoma, U.S.
|align=left|
|-
|Win
|
|align=left| Ronnie Crawford
|TKO
|2
|21/01/1986
|align=left| Trade Winds Central Inn, Oklahoma City, Oklahoma, U.S.
|align=left|
|-
|Win
|
|align=left| Jamie Howe
|PTS
|10
|28/08/1985
|align=left| Wheeling, West Virginia, U.S.
|align=left|
|-
|Loss
|
|align=left| Willie Edwards
|TKO
|9
|16/05/1985
|align=left| Winnipeg Arena, Winnipeg, Manitoba, Canada
|align=left|
|-
|Win
|
|align=left| John Jones
|TKO
|3
|26/04/1985
|align=left| Hammond, Indiana, U.S.
|align=left|
|-
|Win
|
|align=left| Don Hurtle
|TKO
|6
|08/09/1984
|align=left| Winnipeg Arena, Winnipeg, Manitoba, Canada
|align=left|
|-
|Win
|
|align=left| Carlos Tite
|TKO
|2
|28/06/1984
|align=left| Holiday Star Theatre, Merrillville, Indiana, U.S.
|align=left|
|-
|Win
|
|align=left| Jimmy Gradson
|KO
|1
|11/02/1984
|align=left| Brandon Community Arena, Winnipeg, Manitoba, Canada
|align=left|
|-
|Win
|
|align=left| Nathaniel Akbar
|KO
|3
|25/11/1983
|align=left| Pacific Coliseum, Vancouver, British Columbia, Canada
|align=left|
|-
|Win
|
|align=left| Roddy MacDonald
|TKO
|10
|04/07/1983
|align=left| Wilfrid Laurier University, Waterloo, Ontario, Canada
|align=left|
|-
|Win
|
|align=left| Don Hurtle
|UD
|8
|15/11/1982
|align=left| Royal York Hotel, Toronto, Ontario, Canada
|align=left|
|-
|Win
|
|align=left| Frank Lux
|KO
|2
|07/10/1982
|align=left| International Inn, Winnipeg, Manitoba, Canada
|align=left|
|-
|Win
|
|align=left| Jimmy Baker
|TKO
|8
|30/09/1982
|align=left| Marshall Hall, Kitchener, Ontario, Canada
|align=left|
|-
|Win
|
|align=left| Akbar Abdullah
|TKO
|2
|23/08/1982
|align=left| Ramsey, Minnesota, U.S.
|align=left|
|-
|Win
|
|align=left| Ken Johnson
|KO
|2
|29/06/1982
|align=left| Convention Centre, Winnipeg, Manitoba, Canada
|align=left|
|-
|Win
|
|align=left| Randy Jackson
|KO
|2
|12/02/1982
|align=left| International Inn, Winnipeg, Manitoba, Canada
|align=left|
|-
|Win
|
|align=left| Akbar Abdullah
|UD
|6
|10/12/1981
|align=left| Convention Centre, Winnipeg, Manitoba, Canada
|align=left|
|-
|Win
|
|align=left| Jean-Claude LeClair
|TKO
|2
|03/11/1981
|align=left| Paul Sauvé Arena, Montreal, Quebec, Canada
|align=left|
|-
|Win
|
|align=left| Wilbert Johnson
|TKO
|2
|10/10/1981
|align=left| Winnipeg, Manitoba, Canada
|align=left|
|-
|Loss
|
|align=left| Wilbert Johnson
|UD
|6
|06/03/1981
|align=left| Convention Centre, Winnipeg, Manitoba, Canada
|align=left|
|-
|Win
|
|align=left| Jimmy Green
|TKO
|3
|20/01/1981
|align=left| Convention Centre, Winnipeg, Manitoba, Canada
|align=left|
|-
|Win
|
|align=left| Muhammed Smith
|KO
|1
|12/11/1980
|align=left| Convention Centre, Winnipeg, Manitoba, Canada
|align=left|
|-
|Win
|
|align=left| Edmond Esquirol
|UD
|4
|16/09/1980
|align=left| Convention Centre, Winnipeg, Manitoba, Canada
|align=left|
|-
|Win
|
|align=left| Ken Nichols
|TKO
|2
|24/04/1980
|align=left| Convention Centre, Winnipeg, Manitoba, Canada
|align=left|
|}

References

 Donny ‘Golden Boy’ Lalonde Is Back In Town

External links

 
 Donny Lalonde’s biography at Manitoba Sports Hall of Fame and Museum
 https://www.thestar.com/news/world/2016/05/17/the-panama-papers-costa-rican-land-deals-put-canadian-golden-boy-donny-lalonde-on-the-ropes.html

|-

1960 births
Living people
Canadian male boxers
Sportspeople from Kitchener, Ontario
Boxing people from Ontario
World Boxing Council champions
Cruiserweight boxers